The women's lightweight (52 kg/114.4 lbs) Low-Kick division at the W.A.K.O. European Championships 2004 in Budva was the second lightest of the female Low-Kick tournaments and involved just three fighters.  Each of the matches was three rounds of two minutes each and were fought under Low-Kick kickboxing rules.

As there were not enough contestants for a tournament designed for four, one of the women received a bye through to the final.  The gold medal was won by Russian Maria Krivoshapkina who defeated Italian Rita De Angelis by split decision.  Hungary's Reka Krempf picked up a bronze medal.

Results

Key

See also
List of WAKO Amateur European Championships
List of WAKO Amateur World Championships
List of female kickboxers

References

External links
 WAKO World Association of Kickboxing Organizations Official Site

W.A.K.O. European Championships 2004 (Budva)